The Alfa M44 was a Spanish machine gun developed during World War II. At this time, stocks of machine guns ran low and no outside source was available. Non-combatant nations found that the belligerent nations were unable to supply as they were preoccupied with meeting their own wartime production needs. It complimented the ZB-26 light machine gun, and replaced the aging Hotchkiss M1914 machine gun. Originally chambered in 7.92×57mm Mauser, in 1955 an updated version chambered in 7.62×51mm NATO was introduced, and was subsequently issued to Spanish troops, sometimes referred to as the M55. Along with Spain, the M44 was also prominently used by Egypt, whose army had standardised on the 7.92×57mm Mauser round.

Gallery

See also
 Breda M37
 ZB-53
 M1919 Browning machine gun
 SG-43 Goryunov

References

External links
  Image of an ALFA M44 mounted on a tripod with a distinctive cylindrical hopper for the belt feed
  ALFA Modelo 44

7.62×51mm NATO machine guns
7.92×57mm Mauser machine guns
Medium machine guns
Military equipment introduced in the 1950s
Infantry weapons of the Cold War
Weapons of Egypt
Machine guns of Spain